Battalia pie (obsolete spelling battaglia pye) is an English large game pie, or occasionally a fish pie, filled with many small "blessed" pieces, beatilles, of offal, in a gravy made from meat stock flavoured with spices and lemon. The dish was described in cookery books of the 17th and 18th centuries.

Confusion with words for battle led to the pie being crenellated, or shaped to resemble a castle with towers.

Etymology

A battalia pie was so named because it was filled with beatilles, small blessed objects (from Latin beatus, blessed) such as, according to the Oxford English Dictionary, "Cocks-combs, Goose-gibbets, Ghizzards, Livers, and other Appurtenances of Fowls (1706)". It is not connected with Italian battaglia, battle, but it was regularly confused with that meaning, and battalia pies were built with crenellated battlements around the edges, and sometimes as castles complete with towers.

Recipe

The 1658 cookery book The Compleat Cook by "W. M." gives an early recipe for battalia pie:

In his 1660 cookery book The Accomplisht Cook, Robert May gives a recipe "To make a Bisk or Batalia Pie", which instructs:

John Nott's 1723 The Cooks and Confectioners Dictionary gives a recipe for battalia pie with fish:

In her 1727 cookery book The Compleat Housewife, Eliza Smith describes battalia pie as follows:

Smith's recipe was republished in Michael Willis's 1831 Cookery Made Easy, and in Anne Walbank Buckland's 1893 book, Our Viands: Whence they Come and How they are Cooked.

In literature

Former prime minister of the United Kingdom and author Benjamin Disraeli describes an English dinner of the previous century in his 1837 novel Venetia, with

Recreations

Battalia pies were recreated at Naworth Castle in 2006 and at Westport House, Ireland in 2015.

Notes

References

External links
 Historic Food 2005-6 A gilded battalia pie stands in the centre of a loaded table at Naworth Castle.

English cuisine